"Grief Never Grows Old" is a song written by Mike Read and recorded by the music supergroup One World Project in 2005 to raise money for relief of the 2004 Indian Ocean earthquake and tsunami in Asia. It was released on 24 January 2005 and reached a peak position of number 4 in the UK Singles Chart.

Background
The musicians who sang in the song were Gerry Beckley, Dewey Bunnell, Jeffrey Foskett, Boy George, Barry Gibb, Robin Gibb, Randell Kirsch, Cliff Richard, Russell Watson, Brian Wilson, Steve Winwood. Other musicians and celebrities on the record were Jon Anderson, Celina Cherry, Kenney Jones, Hank Linderman, Gary Moore, Mike Read, Rick Wakeman and Bill Wyman.

The song was produced by Steve Levine
The musical director was Darren Sell

2005 singles
All-star recordings
Charity singles
2005 songs
UK Independent Singles Chart number-one singles